In probability theory and statistics, the continuous uniform distributions or rectangular distributions are a family of symmetric probability distributions. Such a distribution describes an experiment where there is an arbitrary outcome that lies between certain bounds. The interval can either be closed (i.e. ) or open (i.e. ). Therefore, the distribution is often abbreviated  where  stands for uniform distribution. The difference between the bounds defines the interval length; all intervals of the same length on the distribution's support are equally probable. It is the maximum entropy probability distribution for a random variable  under no constraint other than that it is contained in the distribution's support.

Definitions

Probability density function 
The probability density function of the continuous uniform distribution is:

Sometimes they are chosen to be zero, and sometimes chosen to be  The latter is appropriate in the context of estimation by the method of maximum likelihood. Also, it is consistent with the sign function, which has no such ambiguity.

As the base length increases, the height (the density at any particular value within the distribution boundaries) decreases.

In terms of mean  and variance  the probability density function of the continuous uniform distribution is:

Cumulative distribution function 
The cumulative distribution function of the continuous uniform distribution is:

Its inverse is:

In terms of mean  and variance  the cumulative distribution function of the continuous uniform distribution is:

its inverse is:

Example 1. Using the continuous uniform distribution function 
For a random variable  find 

In a graphical representation of the continuous uniform distribution function  the area under the curve within the specified bounds, and displaying the probability, is a rectangle. For the specific example above, the base would be  and the height would be

Example 2. Using the continuous uniform distribution function (conditional) 
For a random variable  find 

The example above is a conditional probability case for the continuous uniform distribution: given that  is true, what is the probability that  Conditional probability changes the sample space, so a new interval length  has to be calculated, where  and  The graphical representation would still follow Example 1, where the area under the curve within the specified bounds displays the probability; the base of the rectangle would be  and the height would be

Generating functions

Moment-generating function 
The moment-generating function of the continuous uniform distribution is:

from which we may calculate the raw moments 

For the special case  the probability density function of the continuous uniform distribution is:

the moment-generating function reduces to the simple form:

Cumulant-generating function 
For  the -th cumulant of the continuous uniform distribution on the interval  is  where  is the -th Bernoulli number.

Standard uniform distribution 
The continuous uniform distribution with parameters  and  i.e.  is called the standard uniform distribution.

One interesting property of the standard uniform distribution is that if  has a standard uniform distribution, then so does  This property can be used for generating antithetic variates, among other things. In other words, this property is known as the inversion method where the continuous standard uniform distribution can be used to generate random numbers for any other continuous distribution. If  is a uniform random number with standard uniform distribution, i.e. with  then  generates a random number  from any continuous distribution with the specified cumulative distribution function

Relationship to other functions 
As long as the same conventions are followed at the transition points, the probability density function of the continuous uniform distribution may also be expressed in terms of the Heaviside step function as:

or in terms of the rectangle function as:

There is no ambiguity at the transition point of the sign function. Using the half-maximum convention at the transition points, the continuous uniform distribution may be expressed in terms of the sign function as:

Properties

Moments 
The mean (first raw moment) of the continuous uniform distribution is:

The second raw moment of this distribution is:

In general, the -th raw moment of this distribution is:

The variance (second central moment) of this distribution is:

Order statistics 

 has a beta distribution, with parameters  and 

The expected value is:

This fact is useful when making Q–Q plots.

The variance is:

See also:

Uniformity 
The probability that a continuously uniformly distributed random variable falls within any interval of fixed length is independent of the location of the interval itself (but it is dependent on the interval size ), so long as the interval is contained in the distribution's support.

which is independent of  This fact motivates the distribution's name.

Generalization to Borel sets 
This distribution can be generalized to more complicated sets than intervals. Let  be a Borel set of positive, finite Lebesgue measure  i.e.

Related distributions 
 If X has a standard uniform distribution, then by the inverse transform sampling method, Y = − λ−1 ln(X) has an exponential distribution with (rate) parameter λ.
 If X has a standard uniform distribution, then Y = Xn has a beta distribution with parameters (1/n,1). As such,
 The standard uniform distribution is a special case of the beta distribution, with parameters (1,1).
 The Irwin–Hall distribution is the sum of n i.i.d. U(0,1) distributions.
 The sum of two independent, equally distributed, uniform distributions yields a symmetric triangular distribution.
 The distance between two i.i.d. uniform random variables also has a triangular distribution, although not symmetric.

Statistical inference

Estimation of parameters

Estimation of maximum

Minimum-variance unbiased estimator 

This follows for the same reasons as estimation for the discrete distribution, and can be seen as a very simple case of maximum spacing estimation. This problem is commonly known as the German tank problem, due to application of maximum estimation to estimates of German tank production during World War II.

Maximum likelihood estimator 
The maximum likelihood estimator is:

where  is the sample maximum, also denoted as  the maximum order statistic of the sample.

Method of moment estimator 
The method of moments estimator is:

where  is the sample mean.

Estimation of midpoint 
The midpoint of the distribution,  is both the mean and the median of the uniform distribution. Although both the sample mean and the sample median are unbiased estimators of the midpoint, neither is as efficient as the sample mid-range, i.e. the arithmetic mean of the sample maximum and the sample minimum, which is the UMVU estimator of the midpoint (and also the maximum likelihood estimate).

Confidence interval

For the maximum 
Let  be a sample from  where  is the maximum value in the population. Then  has the Lebesgue-Borel-density 

 where  is the indicator function of 

The confidence interval given before is mathematically incorrect, as

However, one can solve
one then chooses the smallest  possible satisfying the condition above. Note that the interval length depends upon the random variable

Occurrence and applications 
The probabilities for uniform distribution function are simple to calculate due to the simplicity of the function form. Therefore, there are various applications that this distribution can be used for as shown below: hypothesis testing situations, random sampling cases, finance, etc. Furthermore, generally, experiments of physical origin follow a uniform distribution (e.g. emission of radioactive particles). However, it is important to note that in any application, there is the unchanging assumption that the probability of falling in an interval of fixed length is constant.

Economics example for uniform distribution 
In the field of economics, usually demand and replenishment may not follow the expected normal distribution. As a result, other distribution models are used to better predict probabilities and trends such as Bernoulli process. But according to Wanke (2008), in the particular case of investigating lead-time for inventory management at the beginning of the life cycle when a completely new product is being analyzed, the uniform distribution proves to be more useful. In this situation, other distribution may not be viable since there is no existing data on the new product or that the demand history is unavailable so there isn't really an appropriate or known distribution. The uniform distribution would be ideal in this situation since the random variable of lead-time (related to demand) is unknown for the new product but the results are likely to range between a plausible range of two values. The lead-time would thus represent the random variable. From the uniform distribution model, other factors related to lead-time were able to be calculated such as cycle service level and shortage per cycle. It was also noted that the uniform distribution was also used due to the simplicity of the calculations.

Sampling from an arbitrary distribution 

The uniform distribution is useful for sampling from arbitrary distributions. A general method is the inverse transform sampling method, which uses the cumulative distribution function (CDF) of the target random variable. This method is very useful in theoretical work. Since simulations using this method require inverting the CDF of the target variable, alternative methods have been devised for the cases where the CDF is not known in closed form. One such method is rejection sampling.

The normal distribution is an important example where the inverse transform method is not efficient. However, there is an exact method, the Box–Muller transformation, which uses the inverse transform to convert two independent uniform random variables into two independent normally distributed random variables.

Quantization error 

In analog-to-digital conversion, a quantization error occurs. This error is either due to rounding or truncation. When the original signal is much larger than one least significant bit (LSB), the quantization error is not significantly correlated with the signal, and has an approximately uniform distribution. The RMS error therefore follows from the variance of this distribution.

Random variate generation 
There are many applications in which it is useful to run simulation experiments. Many programming languages come with implementations to generate pseudo-random numbers which are effectively distributed according to the standard uniform distribution.

On the other hand, the uniformly distributed numbers are often used as the basis for non-uniform random variate generation.

History 
While the historical origins in the conception of uniform distribution are inconclusive, it is speculated that the term "uniform" arose from the concept of equiprobability in dice games (note that the dice games would have discrete and not continuous uniform sample space). Equiprobability was mentioned in Gerolamo Cardano's Liber de Ludo Aleae, a manual written in 16th century and detailed on advanced probability calculus in relation to dice.

See also 
 Discrete uniform distribution
 Beta distribution
 Box–Muller transform
 Probability plot
 Q–Q plot
 Rectangular function
 Irwin–Hall distribution — In the degenerate case where n=1, the Irwin-Hall distribution generates a uniform distribution between 0 and 1.
 Bates distribution — Similar to the Irwin-Hall distribution, but rescaled for n. Like the Irwin-Hall distribution, in the degenerate case where n=1, the Bates distribution generates a uniform distribution between 0 and 1.

References

Further reading

External links 
 Online calculator of Uniform distribution (continuous)

Continuous distributions
Location-scale family probability distributions

su:Sebaran seragam#Kasus kontinyu